Bob Jackson may refer to:

Bob Jackson (American football) (born 1940), former professional American football running back
Bob Jackson (football manager), manager of the English football club Portsmouth F.C., 1947–1952
Bob Jackson (footballer, born 1934), English footballer
Bob Jackson (musician) (born 1949), keyboardist/guitarist
Bob Jackson (priest) (born 1949), retired Anglican archdeacon and consultant on church growth
Bob Jackson (swimmer) (born 1957), former international backstroke swimmer
Robert H. Jackson (photographer) (born 1934), known as Bob, photographer of Jack Ruby shooting Lee Harvey Oswald
Bob Jackson (rugby league) (born 1940), Australian rugby league footballer

See also
Robert Jackson (disambiguation)
Bobby Jackson (disambiguation)